Corybas undulatus, commonly known as tailed helmet orchid, is a species of terrestrial orchid endemic to eastern Australia. It has a single leaf and a single translucent grey flower with reddish markings, and a labellum with a bristly surface, fine teeth on the edge and a small tail on the tip.

Description
The leaf is greyish green on the upper surface and silvery green or reddish on the lower side. This part of the labellum has a whitish centre and is covered with tiny bristles. The edges of the labellum have tiny teeth and there is a small tail-like tip on the lower edge. Flowering occurs from May to July.

Taxonomy
The tailed helmet orchid was first formally described in 1833 by Richard Cunningham, who gave it the name Corysanthes undulata and published the description in the New South Wales Magazine. In 1942 Herman Rupp changed the name to Corybas undulatus. The specific epithet (undulatus) is a Latin word meaning "wavy".

Distribution and habitat
Corybas undulatus is an uncommon, often overlook species growing in grassy and heathy forest in coastal areas of Queensland south from Bundaberg to Jervis Bay in New South Wales.

References

undulatus
Endemic orchids of Australia
Orchids of New South Wales
Orchids of Queensland
Plants described in 1833